Maurice Van Nostrand (February 9, 1925 – October 8, 1991) was an American politician who served in the Iowa House of Representatives from the 31st district from 1963 to 1965 and from 1967 to 1971.

He died of a heart attack on October 8, 1991, in Chandler, Arizona at age 66.

References

1925 births
1991 deaths
Republican Party members of the Iowa House of Representatives